Julio Medina (born 13 July 1948) is a Chilean boxer. He competed in the men's welterweight event at the 1972 Summer Olympics.

References

External links
 

1948 births
Living people
Chilean male boxers
Olympic boxers of Chile
Boxers at the 1972 Summer Olympics
Place of birth missing (living people)
Welterweight boxers
20th-century Chilean people
21st-century Chilean people